Epipyrops is a genus of moths in the family Epipyropidae. Also known as Fulgoraecia.

Species
Epipyrops atra (Pagenstecher, 1900)
Epipyrops bowringi (Newman, 1851)
Epipyrops cerolestes Tams, 1947
Epipyrops cucullata (Heinrich, 1931)
Epipyrops epityraea Scheven, 1974
Epipyrops exigua (H. Edwards, 1882)
Epipyrops fuliginosa (Tams, 1922)
Epipyrops fulvipunctata Distant, 1913
Epipyrops grandidieri Viette, 1961
Epipyrops malagassica Jordan, 1928
Epipyrops pallidipuncta (Hampson, 1896)
Epipyrops poliographa Hampson, 1910
Epipyrops radama Viette, 1961

Former species
Epipyrops anomala Bowring, 1852
Epipyrops eurybrachydis T. B. Fletcher, 1920
Epipyrops melanoleuca T. B. Fletcher, 1939
Epipyrops schawerdae Zerny 1929

References

Bowring 1852, in Westwood. Transactions of the Entomological Society of London (2) 2 (Proc.): 5.

Epipyropidae
Zygaenoidea genera